Bharani is an Indian film score and soundtrack composer. He has predominantly scored music for Tamil films apart from working in Telugu and Kannada films . He has also sung few of his own compositions.

Early life

Bharani was born in a village near Tanjore and was the eldest son in a family of three brothers. He studied up until Class 10 and actively used to compose songs during his school days, and came to Chennai in 1989 seeking an opportunity.

Career

Bharani, under his real name Gunasekaran, initially made a breakthrough as a lyricist and wrote Vijay's first on screen song for Naalaiya Theerpu (1992).

Bharani was introduced as a music director by director S. A. Chandrasekhar in Periyanna (1999), before going to gain acclaim for his work in film such as Paarvai Ondre Podhume (2001) and Charlie Chaplin (2002). Veluthu Kattu in 2010 was his twenty fifth venture. He made his directorial debut with Ondikatta in 2017.

Discography

References

Living people
People from Thanjavur district
Tamil film score composers
Telugu film score composers
Malayalam film score composers
1971 births